The Tanzania men's national field hockey team represent Tanzania in men's international competitions and is controlled by the Tanzania Hockey Association, the governing body for field hockey in Uganda.

Tanzania has participated once at the Summer Olympics in 1980 when they finished sixth.

Tournament record

Summer Olympics
 1980 – 6th

Africa Cup of Nations
1983 – 6th

African Games
1987 – 6th

African Olympic Qualifier
2015 – 8th

Hockey World League
2014–15 – Round 1

See also
Tanzania women's national field hockey team

References

African men's national field hockey teams
National team
Field hockey